IFK Eskilstuna is a Swedish football club located in Eskilstuna in Södermanland County. In their early seasons IFK had a proud record as an Allsvenskan club. They now play in Division 2 Västra Svealand, which is the fourth tier of Swedish football.

Background

Idrottsföreningen Kamraterna Eskilstuna, which is the club's full name, were founded on 9 September 1897 and have a long rivalry with Eskilstuna City FK.  Historically IFK Eskilstuna have the stronger record having spent 14 seasons in the Allsvenskan but currently Eskilstuna City FK play in a higher division.  In 1910, IFK participated in the first Svenska Serien along with IFK Göteborg, Örgryte IS, AIK and IFK Norrköping.  Their first championship final match took place in 1921 when IFK defeated IK Sleipner 2–1 at the Stockholm Olympic Stadium before 11,695 spectators.  They competed in another championship final match in 1923, this time going down 5–1 to AIK.

In the early years, the club also played bandy and was playing in the then Swedish top-tier league Division 1 for two years in the 1930s.

IFK competed in the very first Allsvenskan season in 1924/25 and played a further 13 seasons in the Allsvenskan from 1924/25-1928/29, 1930/31-1935/36, 1942/43, 1957/58 and 1964.  Their best season was in 1931/32 when they finished in fifth place.  The marathon table of Allsvenskan teams shows IFK in 23rd position, their last season at the highest level being in 1964.

IFK reached the Allsvenskan qualifying stage in 1981 after winning Division 2 Norra in fine style by pipping Örebro SK to the top position.  However, IFK failed to win the play-offs against Kalmar FF to progress to the higher level.  The 1987 season proved another near miss when IFK finished in second place to second place in Division I Norra to Djurgarden. In 1988 history was repeated, this time IFK finishing second to Örebro SK.

In 1992 IFK were relegated from Division 1 and subsequently have competed in the middle divisions of the Swedish football league system.  The club currently plays in Division 3 Västra Svealand which is the fifth tier of Swedish football. They play their home matches at the Tunavallen in Eskilstuna.

IFK Eskilstuna are affiliated to the Södermanlands Fotbollförbund. The club have an active youth section. In 1970 and 1985 the junior team won the Swedish Junior Championship. Famous footballers who have played for IFK Eskilstuna include Kenneth Andersson and Sebastian Larsson.

Season to season

Attendances

In recent seasons IFK Eskilstuna have had the following average attendances:

The attendance record at Tunavallen was set in 1963 when 22,491 spectators attended the match with GAIS.

Achievements
 Swedish Champions
 Winners (1): 1921

League
 Division 1 Norra:
 Runners-up (2): 1987, 1988

Cups
 Svenska Mästerskapet:
 Winners (1): 1921
 Runners-up (1): 1923

Footnotes
A. The title of "Swedish Champions" has been awarded to the winner of four different competitions over the years. Between 1896 and 1925 the title was awarded to the winner of Svenska Mästerskapet, a stand-alone cup tournament. No club were given the title between 1926 and 1930 even though the first-tier league Allsvenskan was played. In 1931 the title was reinstated and awarded to the winner of Allsvenskan. Between 1982 and 1990 a play-off in cup format was held at the end of the league season to decide the champions. After the play-off format in 1991 and 1992 the title was decided by the winner of Mästerskapsserien, an additional league after the end of Allsvenskan. Since the 1993 season the title has once again been awarded to the winner of Allsvenskan.

Notes

External links
 IFK Eskilstuna – Official website
 IFK Eskilstuna – Football website
  IFK Eskilstuna Facebook
 IFK Eskilstuna Twitter

Sport in Eskilstuna
Association football clubs established in 1897
Bandy clubs established in 1897
Football clubs in Södermanland County
Allsvenskan clubs
1897 establishments in Sweden
Idrottsföreningen Kamraterna